Daniel Paul Arulswamy (5 September 1916 – 12 October 2003) was an Indian clergyman and bishop for the Roman Catholic Diocese of Kumbakonam. Arulswamy was born in Viragalur. He died on 12 October 2003, at the age of 87.

Career
Arulswamy became ordained in 1944. He was appointed bishop in 1955.

On 16 August 1988, he resigned from his position as bishop for the Roman Catholic Diocese of Kumbakonam.

References

1916 births
2003 deaths
People from Ariyalur district
20th-century Roman Catholic bishops in India
21st-century Roman Catholic bishops in India